International Talk Like a Pirate Day is a parodic holiday created in 1995 by John Baur and Mark Summers of Albany, Oregon, who proclaimed September 19 each year as the day when everyone in the world should talk like a pirate.

History 

The holiday resulted from a sports injury. During a racquetball game between Summers and Baur, one of them, in pain, said, "Aaarrr!" and the idea was born. The game took place on June 6, 1995, but out of respect for the observance of the Normandy landings, they chose Summers' ex-wife's birthday, as it would be easy for him to remember.

At first an inside joke between two friends, the holiday gained exposure when Baur and Summers sent a letter about their invented holiday to the American syndicated humor columnist Dave Barry in 2002. Barry liked the idea and promoted the day, and later appeared in a cameo in their "Drunken Sailor" Sing Along A-Go-Go video. Michigan filk musician Tom Smith wrote the original "Talk Like a Pirate Day" song in 2003.

Talk Like a Pirate Day is celebrated with hidden easter egg features in many games and websites, with Facebook introducing a pirate-translated version of its website on Talk Like a Pirate Day 2008 and publisher O'Reilly discounting books on the R programming language. In September 2014, Reddit added a pirate theme to their website.

References

Further reading 
 Russell, William Clark (1883). Sailors' Language. Dictionary of 19th-century sailors' language.
 Choundas, George. 2007. The Pirate Primer: Mastering the Language of Swashbucklers and Rogues. Cincinnati: Writers Digest.

External links 

 , by John Baur and Mark Summers 
 Talk Like a Pirate Day Website, UK - WaybackMachine
 Interview with the founders on how it started 

1995 establishments in Oregon
Awareness days
Civil awareness days
Culture of Albany, Oregon
Language observances
Piracy in fiction
Public awareness campaigns
Recurring events established in 1995
September observances
Unofficial observances